The Northern Rail Nines was a one-off rugby league nines tournament held in Lytham St Annes and Blackpool, England as part of a celebration weekend encompassing the Northern Rail Cup Final.

Held over the weekend of 11 and 12 July 2009, it was won by Blackpool Panthers with Halifax winning the Plate final.

The tournament was staged at Woodlands Memorial Ground, Lytham St Annes, the home of Blackpool Panthers with the final at Bloomfield Road, Blackpool.

The event was supported by the Northwest Regional Development Agency (NWDA), complementing a three-year £3.5million funding package to support a programme of signature events in Blackpool announced by the NWDA in June 2007. Every English Co-operative Championship and Championship 1 sides not involved in the 2009 Northern Rail Cup Final entered full strength sides into the tournament.

The first day of the competition will saw all eighteen clubs playing in group stages, with the top eight sides going forward to a straight knock-out competition on the Sunday for the Northern Rail Nine's trophy. Meanwhile the ten remaining sides also competed on the Sunday in a competition to win the Northern Rail Nine's plate.

The finals of both the Northern Rail Nine's trophy and plate were played as curtain raisers to the 13-a-side Northern Rail Cup Final at Bloomfield Road on 12 July.

The winners of the competition were awarded a place in the Carnegie Floodlit Nines.

Group stages 
The teams were divided into five groups on Saturday. The top two teams in group's A, B and C progressed to the Northern Rail Nines Trophy competition whilst the bottom two entered the Plate competition. Each team in Pool D played each team in Pool E with the top side from each group qualifying for the Trophy competition and the remaining teams contesting the Plate.

Group A
Swinton Lions
Rochdale Hornets
Blackpool Panthers
Dewsbury Rams

Group B
Batley Bulldogs
Keighley Cougars
Hunslet Hawks
Doncaster

Group C
London Skolars
Leigh Centurions
Gateshead Thunder
York City Knights

Group D
Whitehaven
Workington Town
Featherstone Rovers

Group E
Oldham R.L.F.C.
Sheffield Eagles
Halifax

Group A 

Blackpool Panthers 20–8 Rochdale Hornets
Dewsbury Rams 22–4 Swinton Lions
Blackpool Panthers 26–10 Swinton Lions
Dewsbury Rams 28–14 Rochdale Hornets
Rochdale Hornets 4–20 Swinton Lions
Blackpool Panthers 12–26 Dewsbury Rams

Group B 

Batley Bulldogs 24–6 Doncaster
Hunslet Hawks 16–6 Keighley Cougars
Batley Bulldogs 22–10 Keighley Cougars
Hunslet Hawks 24–6 Doncaster
Batley Bulldogs 6–8 Hunslet Hawks
Doncaster 22–12 Keighley Cougars

Group C 

Leigh Centurions 22–0 London Skolars
Gateshead Thunder 10–20 York City Knights
Gateshead Thunder 10–20 Leigh Centurions
London Skolars 14–26 York City Knights
Gateshead Thunder 22–16 London Skolars
Leigh Centurions 6–16 York City Knights

Groups D & E 
Group D

Group E

Featherstone Rovers 16–8 Halifax
Oldham 4–16 Whitehaven
Sheffield Eagles 26–8 Workington Town
Sheffield 24–10 Whitehaven
Featherstone Rovers 20–16 Oldham
Halifax 20–4 Workington
Halifax 26–10 Whitehaven
Featherstone Rovers 22–22 Sheffield Eagles
Oldham 24–14 Workington Town

Plate 
Qualifying round

Quarter-finals

Semi-finals

Plate final

Trophy 
Quarter-finalsSemi-finalsTrophy final'''

Winners

Trophy
2009 Blackpool Panthers 14–10 Sheffield Eagles
2010 Halifax 16–4 Sheffield Eagles

Plate
2009 Halifax 24–20 Gateshead Thunder

See also
Northern Rail Cup

References

External links

Sport in Blackpool
Rugby league nines competitions in the United Kingdom
2009 in English sport